John Currie (2 January 1910 – 20 December 1989) was a Canadian cross-country skier. He competed in the men's 18 kilometre event at the 1932 Winter Olympics.

References

1910 births
1989 deaths
Canadian male cross-country skiers
Olympic cross-country skiers of Canada
Cross-country skiers at the 1932 Winter Olympics
Skiers from Ottawa